Eirik Hundvin (born 8 February 1950), also known as Pytten, is a Norwegian producer and recording engineer for many classic black metal albums, mainly by Norwegian bands, nearly all of which were recorded in the Grieg Hall in Bergen.

Hundvin is the father of Mia Terese Hundvin (born 7 March 1977 in Bergen, Norway), a professional team handball player.

Albums produced 
Aeternus
Beyond the Wandering Moon
...And So The Night Became
Shadows Of Old
Burning the Shroud
Ascension Of Terror
A Darker Monument
Hexaeon

Borknagar
Borknagar

Burzum
Burzum
Aske
Det Som Engang Var
Hvis Lyset Tar Oss
Filosofem
Belus
Fallen
From the Depths of Darkness
Umskiptar

Corona Borealis 
Cantus Paganus

Dark Fortress
Profane Genocidal Creations

Demonic
Lead Us Into Darkness

Einherjer
Dragons of the North
Far Far North

Enslaved
 Vikingligr Veldi
 Frost (on which he also plays fretless bass on the track "Yggdrasil")
 Eld
 Monumension
Below the Lights
 Isa

Emperor 
In the Nightside Eclipse
Reverence
Anthems to the Welkin at Dusk

Gaahlskagg
Erotic Funeral

Gorgoroth  
Pentagram
Antichrist
Under The Sign Of Hell
Destroyer (or About How to Philosophize with the Hammer)
True Norwegian Black Metal - Live in Grieghallen

Hades
...Again Shall Be
Dawn of the Dying Sun
Millennium Nocturne

Helheim
Jormundgand
Av Norrøn Ætt
Yersinia Pestis

Immortal  
Diabolical Fullmoon Mysticism
Pure Holocaust
Battles in the North
All Shall Fall

Malsain
They Never Die

Mayhem 
De Mysteriis Dom Sathanas

Mörk Gryning
Maelstrom Chaos

Obtained Enslavement
Witchcraft
Soulblight

Old Funeral
Devoured Carcass 
Abduction of Limbs
The Older Ones

Taake
Nattestid Ser Porten Vid
Hordalands doedskvad

Thorium
Ocean of Blasphemy

Trelldom
Til Et Annet
Til Minne...

Windir
Arntor

External links 
 

1950 births
Living people
Norwegian record producers
Norwegian audio engineers